Hampton railway station may refer to:
Hampton railway station (London), England
Hampton-in-Arden railway station, England
Hampton railway station, Melbourne, Australia
Hampton station (New Brunswick), Canada
Hampton station (DART), Dallas

See also
Hampton Court railway station, London